Heal(s) may refer to:

 Healing, the process of repair and regeneration of damaged organic tissue

Business 
Heal's, a British department store
Alive & Well AIDS Alternatives, formerly Health Education AIDS Liaison (HEAL), an organization of AIDS denialists

Entertainment

Albums
 Heal (Sacred Reich album), 1996
 Heal (Loreen album), or the title song

EPs
 Heal (Lovelyz EP), a 2018 EP by South Korean girl group Lovelyz
 Heal, a 2020 EP by Sam Smith

Songs
 "Heal", by Bic Runga from Drive
 "Heal", by Natascha Bessez
 "Heal", by Westlife from Turnaround
 "Heal", by Yuna Ito
 "Heal" (Ellie Goulding song)
 "Heal" (Southeast Asian artists song)

Film 
 Heal (film), a 2017 documentary film about mind-body interventions

Other uses
 Heal (surname)
 Ian Healy (born 1964), nicknamed "Heals", Australian cricketer

See also
 Healer (disambiguation)
 Healing (disambiguation)
 Heel (disambiguation)
 Hele (disambiguation)
 Heale